The Carriage Works are in Stokes Croft, Bristol, England.

History

They were built in 1862 by Edward William Godwin from Pennant stone with Bath stone dressings. It has round arched arcades above double width segmental arches. The ground-floor arches were originally open for access by John Perry and Sons' carriages. In 1844 Thomas and John Perry paid £3 per year to rent the site. By the beginning of the 20th century Perry's had modernised from horse carriages to include the manufacture of cars at the site. From 1913 until 1960s the building was used to process rubber by the Anderson's Bristol Rubber Co. Ltd. In the 1960 it was home to Regional Pools Promotions a membership scheme which gave prizes and raised money for charity, and later moved next door to Westmoreland House.

The building has been designated by English Heritage as a grade II* listed building. The building, which is an example of the Bristol Byzantine style, is on the English Heritage Buildings at Risk Register and described as being in very bad condition.

In September 2011 the Carriageworks Action Group was launched to develop community ideas for the future of the building, the neighbouring Westmoreland House and the land behind.  The Action Group is made up of local residents, organisations and businesses, supported by Bristol City Council, and proposes to write a 'community vision' for the site.

In June 2013 a housing association, Knightstone Housing, was named as the preferred developer. In 2015 a planning application was made to Bristol City Council by Fifth Capital to develop the site for a mixed use scheme including 112 homes and designed by Assael Architecture. This was approved in October 2015 despite concerns about the lack of affordable housing included in the scheme.

Demolition of the bulk of The Carriage Works, and the adjacent Westmoreland House began on 21 November 2018. The facade of the building has been retained.

See also
 Grade II* listed buildings in Bristol
 Westmoreland House

References

External links

Carriageworks Action Group

Grade II* listed buildings in Bristol
Industrial buildings completed in 1862
Structures on the Heritage at Risk register
Byzantine Revival architecture in the United Kingdom
1862 establishments in England
Grade II* listed industrial buildings
Buildings and structures demolished in 2018
Demolished buildings and structures in Bristol